The 1978 Wyoming gubernatorial election took place on November 7, 1978. Incumbent Democratic Governor Edgar Herschler ran for re-election to a second term. After winning a contested Democratic primary, he advanced to the general election, where he faced former State Senator John Ostlund, the Republican nominee. Despite the strong Republican performance nationwide, Herschler's personal popularity allowed him to narrowly win re-election to Ostlund, making him the first Democratic Governor to win re-election since Lester C. Hunt in 1946.

Democratic primary

Candidates
 Edgar Herschler, incumbent Governor
 Margaret McKinstry, member of the Laramie County Community College Board of Trustees

Results

Republican Primary

Candidates
 John Ostlund, former State Senator
 Gus Fleischli, former State Representative
 Jim Bace, real estate agent

Results

Results

References

1978 Wyoming elections
1978
Wyoming
November 1978 events